E. H. "Sallie" Jones was an American  football coach.  He was the third head football coach at the University of Missouri in Columbia, Missouri, serving for one season, in 1892, and compiling a record of 1–2.

Head coaching record

References

Year of birth missing
Year of death missing
Missouri Tigers football coaches